Paul Webb is an English musician.

Paul Webb may also refer to:

Paul Webb (basketball), college basketball coach
Paul Webb (footballer), English footballer
Paul Webb (screenwriter), British screenwriter and playwright